Dycladia melaena is a moth of the subfamily Arctiinae. It was described by George Hampson in 1898. It is found in Bolivia and Espírito Santo, Brazil.

References

Euchromiina
Moths described in 1898